The discography of Alexandre Pires, a Brazilian singer-songwriter, consists of eleven studio albums, two live albums, three compilations and other album appearances. In 2001, Pires released his first solo album to much success. He has continued to release albums both in Portuguese and in Spanish achieving several hits in Latin charts. In 2007, he released a tribute album to Spanish singer Julio Iglesias. Also in 2007 he met and had a duet on the song titled "Junto A Ti" with Kika Edgar from the telenovela Bajo las Riendas del Amor.

Albums

Studio albums

Compilations

Live albums

Singles

As lead artist

As featured artist

Notes
Notes
A: "Amame" did not enter the Billboard Hot 100, but peaked at number 14 on the Bubbling Under Hot 100 Singles chart.

References

Latin pop music discographies
Discographies of Brazilian artists